Sjors van de Rebellenclub  is a 1955 Dutch adventure film directed by Henk van der Linden. It was based on the popular Dutch comic strip Sjors en Sjimmie.

Cast
Theo Niesten	... 	Sjors
Rinus van Loon	... 	Sjuul
Tonny Hassing	... 	Wimpie
Arno Feite	... 	Lid
Willem Marwa	... 	Sjimmie
Willie Veerwindt	... 	Lid
Victor Servais	... 	De kolonel
Dirk Capel	... 	Pedro
Jan Wassenaar	... 	Boris

External links 
 

Dutch comedy films
Dutch children's films
1955 films
Dutch black-and-white films
1955 adventure films
Films based on Dutch comics
Live-action films based on comics
1950s Dutch-language films
Dutch adventure films